Trochu  is a town in central Alberta, Canada that is surrounded by Kneehill County.

The town is named for Armand Trochu, the settler who founded the St. Anne Ranch Trading Company on the present site of the town in 1903.

Geography

Climate

Demographics 

In the 2016 Census of Population conducted by Statistics Canada, the Town of Trochu recorded a population of 1,058 living in 421 of its 472 total private dwellings, a  change from its 2011 population of 1,072.

The Town of Trochu's 2012 municipal census counted a population of 1,067, a 4.1% decrease from its 2009 municipal census population of 1,113.

Economy 
The main industry is agriculture, though the oil and gas industry is bringing more and more revenue into the area.

Attractions 
Trochu is home to an arboretum, which is home to over 1,000 trees and shrubs of over 100 species, as well as various native and non-native flowering plant species, and showy floral displays.

Trochu also has a local museum and has recreational venues including an arena, an outdoor swimming pool, a campground and ball diamonds.

The town is home to "The World's Tallest Golf Tee", which towers 40 ft tall. It is located just outside the Trochu Golf and Country Club.

Infrastructure 
Amenities in Trochu include a youth centre, a seniors' drop-in centre and an extended care facility (formerly the Trochu Hospital)

Notable people 
Martin Farndale, military general in the British Army and Knight Commander of the Order of the Bath
Kevin Haller, Stanley Cup Champion with the Montreal Canadiens in 1993
Al Purvis, gold medalist Olympian ice hockey player

See also 
List of communities in Alberta
List of towns in Alberta

References

External links 

1911 establishments in Alberta
Kneehill County
Towns in Alberta